Global Environmental Governance is the title of a book written by Adil Najam, Mihaela Papa and Nadaa Taiyab. All the information of this article comes from this book.

Introduction
Global environmental governance (GEG) is the sum of organizations, policy instruments, financing mechanisms, rules, procedures and norms that regulate the processes of global environmental protection. The efficacy of global environmental governance will ultimately depend on implementation at global and domestic levels. National implementation is the ultimate key, both to the efficacy of the GEG system and to meaningful environmental improvements.
Since environmental issues entered the international agenda in the early 1970s, global environmental politics and policies have been developing rapidly. The first global conference on the environment, held in Stockholm in 1972, set in motion three decades of discussion, negotiation and ratification of a whole series of international environmental agreements.
The Stockholm Conference spawned the United Nations Environment Programme. The Earth Summit, held in Rio 20 years later, brought with it the Conventions on Biological Diversity, Climate Change and Desertification and created another UN political institution, the Commission on Sustainable Development. And the desire to host a prestigious international institution led to the decisions to locate the small and underfunded secretariats of many of these agreements in many geographically diverse homes—from Montreal to Bonn to Rome and some places in between. Major institutions, such as the World Bank as well as the World Trade Organization, claim sustainable development as their overarching goal. A similar growth of interest is also seen within non- UN international and regional institutions in terms of environmental and sustainable development concerns.
Multiple sources of funding for international environmental action are now available. These not only include the operational budgets of the various organizations but also specialized funding mechanisms created either as part of specific treaties or in general. For example, the Global Environment Facility (GEF), created in 1991 has financed US$4.8 billion in projects and generated co-financing of US$15.6 billion.

Challenges
Proliferation of MEAs and fragmentation of GEG- There are too many organizations engaged in environmental governance in too many different places, often with duplicative mandates. Fragmentation can lead to conflicting agendas, geographical dispersion and inconsistency in rules and norms, as the different secretariats have limited opportunity to interact and cooperate.
Lack of cooperation and coordination among international organizations-The concern here is about the absence of any meaningful coordination mechanisms for GEG. Theoretically, such coordination is part of UNEP’s natural mandate. However, UNEP has never been given the resources or the political capital to fulfill this mandate. UNEP’s ability to “coordinate” other UN agencies is further hampered by the sheer number of agencies and programs in the UN that have some stake in environmental protection.
Lack of implementation, enforcement and effectiveness in GEG.-The GEG system has turned into a “negotiating system” that seems to be in a perpetual state of negotiation and is obsessed with continuing negotiations rather than thinking about the implementation of existing agreements.
Inefficient use of resources- The concern that is usually raised here is that the system as a whole seems to have significant (even if insufficient) resources, but the duplication and lack of coordination within the system can mean that resources are not always used most efficiently. In 2000, for example, the World Bank had an active portfolio of over US$5 billion in environmental projects, the UNDP’s portfolio was over US$1.2 billion in the same year, and the GEF has funded over US$4.5 billion of projects since its inception. National governments, civil society and the private sector in aggregate also expend significant financial resources on environmental projects. In spite of this impressive pool of money, particular elements of the system remain chronically under-funded. Geographic fragmentation and duplication of activities can result in higher operational costs and inefficient use of resources. With greater coherence in the system of governance and financing, a great deal more could be achieved with the existing resources.
GEG outside the environmental arena- An increasing number of important decisions affecting environmental governance now take place outside the environmental arena, in areas such as trade, investment and international development. While institutions like the WTO, UNDP and the World Bank have begun to pay much more attention to environment and sustainable development than in the past, they still remain largely outside the discussions on global environmental governance
There is inertia within the system and a desire to maintain the status quo-Although the UN has engaged in many self-reform initiatives, actors in the system have an incentive to maintain the status quo. Neither national delegates nor international environmental bureaucrats seem motivated to allow meaningful change in the terms of the GEG system; a system in which, despite all its faults, they feel comfortable and have learned to use to their individual and institutional advantage. The proposals that do emerge, such as those originating from the IEG Working Group, tend to advocate a soft approach and incremental change. 
Developing country concerns- Developing countries have legitimate concerns about the state of the international system. They are already distrustful of the international system in general and are especially concerned about the rapid growth of environmental instruments and its possible impacts on their economic growth. Although developing countries are not necessarily beholden to the status quo, they fear that any change will necessarily make things even worse from their perspective. 
Lack of political will and the balance of national interests versus global environmental problems- National economic and security interests can often run counter to environmental concerns and, consequently, not all nations wish to have a strong system of GEG. Indeed, even when the logic of a stronger global environmental system is apparent, it tends to be overwhelmed by the fact that actors within the system are primarily charged with safeguarding their narrower national and institutional interests.

Models
 Upgrading UNEP Model
Description: Takes UNEP as a departure point for improving environ- mental governance and suggests upgrading it to a specialized agency to strengthen its status.
Designs: This model is similar to the previous but distinct in that it seeks the strengthening of UNEP rather than its replacement by a different super-organization. UNEP itself has been both an active participant and a focus of the reform debate. It has faced significant challenges since its creation (limiting legal mandate, lack of funds, location). The most broadly discussed proposal is upgrading UNEP to a specialized agency so that it can adopt treaties, have its own budget and potentially use innovative financial mechanisms. UNEP would strengthen its role as an “anchor” institution for global environment by drawing on its ability to serve as information and capacity clearing- house and set broad policy guidelines for action within the Global Ministerial Environment Forum (GMEF). Similarly, it has been suggested that UNEP could be upgraded into a decentralized United Nations Environment Organization (UNEO). UNEO would have its own legal identity, and would comprise general assembly, executive structure and secretariat. It would incorporate UNEP and GMEF; take up UNEP’s mandate with respect to its normative function; and serve as the authority for environment within the UN system.
Potential: The current debate on environmental governance seems to converge around the proposal to upgrade UNEP into a specialized agency as a middle ground between making a major change in the system and doing nothing. Upgrading UNEP requires less financial and diplomatic investment than adding a completely new organization. While UNEP has a record of institutional success and learning, its potential to perform when given better legal status, more funds and more staff is promising. On the downside, focusing reform debate only on UNEP distracts us from the broader institutional challenges, and it is not yet clear just how much of a difference specialized agency status will actually give.
 Multiple Actors Model 
Description: Argues that the system of governance comprises multiple actors whose actions need to be mutually reinforcing and better coordinated. Without better integration of these multiple actors, organizational rearrangement cannot resolve institutional problems.
Designs: Multiplicity of actors and interactions form a multidimensional “system” of global environmental governance. It includes states, international environmental organizations, related international organizations, civil society organizations, and public concern and action. Focus on organizations as a single dimension of governance dis- tracts attention from the fact that institutional will is required to affect decision-making procedures and change institutional boundaries. First reform proposal is to integrate environment into the larger context of sustainable development and to allow multiple organizations to flourish but create venues for these organizations to interact and “transact.” Preferring environmental to sustainable development governance may result in further marginalization of environmental problems on the international agenda, alienation of developing countries, and continuing regime clashes between environment and other relevant international regimes. A General Agreement on Environment and Development should be negotiated to codify universally accepted sustainable development principles and serve as an umbrella for existing MEAs. The second reform proposal is to create multiple channels of implementation. The quality of global environmental governance will be increasingly determined by the interaction among five entities in implementation and the ability of the system to facilitate their interaction, e.g., through global public policy networks.
Potential: This model adopts a broad definition of the problem of global environmental governance. Accordingly, the solutions proposed are broad and offer directions the system should follow, rather than specific organizational improvements. While organizational thinking leaves an illusion of control over governance, systems thinking acknowledges the messiness and uncertainty of the system. The complexity of today’s environmental threats like climate change and responses to them prove that multiple channels of implementation naturally emerge but can lack direction if one is not provided by the system. Whether the system is mature enough to reverse environmental degradation via strategic directions and normative guidance remains to be seen.

Goals
Leadership - The GEG system should grasp the attention and visible support of high-profile political leaders. The key institutions within the system should be managed by leaders of the highest professional calibre and international repute; all working together towards the best interests of the GEG system as a whole. 
Knowledge - Science should be the authoritative basis of sound environmental policy. The GEG system should be seen as a knowledge-based and knowledge-producing system. 
Coherence - GEG should operate as a coherent “system” with reasonable coordination, regular communication and a shared sense of direction among its various elements. 
Performance -The institutions that make up the GEG system should be well-managed; they should have the resources they need and should use these resources efficiently; and they should be effective in implementation. The ultimate purpose of the GEG system is to improve the global environmental condition. 
Mainstreaming - The GEG system should seek to incorporate environmental concerns and actions within other areas of international policy and action, and particularly so in the context of sustainable development .

Evidence of Environmental Degradation
The Millennium Ecosystem Assessment and the work of the Intergovernmental Panel on Climate Change have shown that ecosystem decline and global warming continue, representing real dangers to our planet.
This state of affairs is well documented in the Millennium Ecosystem Assessment (2006). For example, despite the feverish discussions about global climate change, carbon emissions continue to rise; global atmospheric  levels that were around 300 parts per million (ppm) in the early 1900s have now reached approximately 380 ppm. The Millennium Ecosystem Assessment also found that approximately 60 per cent of the ecosystems that it examined were either being degraded or used unsustainably. Since 1980, 35 per cent of the world’s mangroves have been lost and 20 per cent of the world’s precious coral reefs have been destroyed. A decade after the signing of the Biodiversity Convention, the species extinction rate is still 1,000 times higher than what would be occurring naturally, without human impact. Despite the dozens of global and regional fisheries treaties, an estimated 90 per cent of the total weight of large predators in the oceans—such as tuna, sharks and swordfish—have disappeared over the last few decades. Estimates suggest that we may still be losing as much as 150,000 square kilometres of forest each year.

Actors
A measure of the diversity of actors within the United Nations system whose activities somehow impact the environment is the membership of the UN Environmental Management Group (EMG) which was established by the UN Secretary General to "enhance UN system-wide inter-agency coordination" and whose membership consists of "programs, organs and specialized agencies of the UN system, and all of the secretariats of multilateral environmental agreements". Each of these organizations has a defined environmental mandate and many have specified environmental activities. The membership of this group gives a still incomplete but impressive, picture of the breadth of actors that influence global environmental governance.
Basel Convention Secretariat Convention on Biodiversity (CBD) 
Universal Postal Union(UPU)
Secretariat Convention on International Trade in Endangered Species (CITES) 
Secretariat Convention on Migratory Species (CMS) 
Secretariat Economic and Social Commission for Africa (ECA)
Economic Commission for Europe (ECE)
Economic and Social Commission for Latin America and the Caribbean (ECLAC)
Economic and Social Commission for Asia and the Pacific (ESCAP)
Economic and Social Commission for West Asia (ESCWA)
Food and Agriculture Organization (FAO)
Global Environment Facility (GEF)
International Atomic Energy Agency (IAEA)
International Civil Aviation Organization (ICAO)
International Fund for Agricultural Development (IFAD)
International Labour Organization (ILO)
International Maritime Organization (IMO)
International Strategy for Disaster Reduction (ISDR) 
Secretariat International Trade Center (ITC)
International Telecommunication Union (ITU)
Office for the Coordination of Humanitarian Affairs (OCHA)
Office of the High Commissioner for Human Rights (OHCHR)
Ramsar Convention on Wetlands Secretariat Convention to Combat Desertification (CCD) 
Secretariat UN Conference on Trade and Development (UNCTAD)
UN Department of Economic and Social Affairs
United Nations Development Programme(UNDP)
United Nations Environment Programme(UNEP)
United Nations Educational, Scientific and Cultural Organization (UNESCO)
United Nations Framework Convention on Climate Change (UNFCCC) 
United Nations Human Settlements Programme (HABITAT )
United Nations High Commissioner for Refugees (UNHCR)
United Nations Children’s Fund(UNICEF)
United Nations Industrial Development Organization (UNIDO)
United Nations Institute for Training and Research (UNITAR)
United Nations University(UNU)
World Food Program( WFP)
World Health Organization( WHO)
World Intellectual Property Organization( WIPO)
World Meteorological Organization( WMO)
The World Trade Organization(WTO)
World Tourism Organization(WTO)
Secretariat United Nations Population Fund(UNFPA)
Division for Sustainable Development (UNDESA/DSD)

References

Environmental non-fiction books